Kings Reverse is a card game for 2 or more players that is played in Iowa, in the United States. For more than 5 players, 1 additional pack of cards may be used. Whoever gets rid of his/her cards first wins the game. Kings Reverse is very similar to the games Uno and Flaps, both belonging to the larger Crazy Eights or shedding family of card games. However Kings Reverse is played with regular packs of playing cards.

History
Rules for Kings Reverse (without the jokers) have existed at least since the mid-1970s, and could have been an adaption of the game Uno for play with regular cards . The jokers and their rules, and the rules for the Ace of spades were introduced in 2015.

Rules
The game is played with 2 packs of regular playing cards plus the 2 jokers from each pack. To start a hand, ten cards are dealt to each player, and the top card of the pack is flipped over and set aside to begin the discard pile. The rest are placed face down as the drawing stack.  The player to the dealer's left plays first, unless the first card on the discard pile is one of special cards (see below). On a player's turn, he/she must do one of the following:

 play a card matching the discard in suit or rank
 play a jack, or a playable joker (see restriction below)
 draw the top card of the deck (if more than one card is accidentally drawn, they all must be kept)

Play proceeds clockwise around the table.

 If a player draws a card that is playable, he/she must play it.
 A player may play a jack at any time, even if that player has other playable cards.
 A player may play a joker only if that player has no other cards he/she can play.  A player who plays a joker may be challenged by the next player in sequence (see Penalties) to prove that his/her hand meets this condition.
 If the entire pack is used during play, the play continues until no one can play a card.  E.g. if player A takes the last of the draw pack, he/she either plays it or passes.  If player A passes, he/she is done and play continues with players B, C, and D.  Player B then either plays a card or passes.  Likewise with player C and D. Play continues until player D has no card to play.  At this point everyone counts their card values and adds to their score.
 It is illegal to trade cards of any sort with another player.

Penalties
If a player lays down his/her next-to-last card without calling "one card" and is caught before his/her next turn, they must draw two cards. If the player is not caught in time, or remembers to call "one card" before being caught, he/she suffers no penalty (see "Ace of Spades" below under "Special Cards")
When a joker is played, the next player can challenge, i.e. demand to see the other cards in the player's hand to ensure the joker was played legally.  If the joker was indeed played illegally, the illegal player retrieves the joker, takes the four cards, and misses his/her turn.  If the joker was played legally, the challenger must take the four cards for the joker AND two more cards for the challenge.

Special Cards
A 7 causes the next player to miss his/her turn and also draw two cards.
An 8 causes the next player to just miss his/her turn.
A king reverses the direction of play.
Jacks are wild cards and can be played on any other card regardless of suit. Thereafter, the suit is that of the jack played.
Jokers are wild cards played the same way as jacks with the additional proviso that the player names the suit to be followed thereafter, and the next player loses his/her turn and draws four cards (The jokers were introduced in 2015 and are based on the Wild Draw 4 cards from Uno))  If a joker is the turncard, it is returned to the drawing pack and another turned instead.
A King and Queen of the same suit can be played at the same time in a marriage (this rule is borrowed from the card game Mau Mau (game))
The Ace of spades allows the player to give one card to each of the other players, handing them out in the same order as play.  Three scenarios are possible:  1) If, after playing the Ace of spades, the player holds as many cards as there are other players, the Ace of spades player simply goes out (he does NOT have to call "one card").  2)  If the player has fewer cards left than there are other players, he/she simply goes out after handing out his/her last card (again, without having to call "one card"), and the players who did not receive a penalty card must take a card from the pile, and the hand ends. 3) If the Ace of spades player holds more cards than there are other players, the game continues as usual (including the "one card" rule, so, if after passing out penalty cards, the player has only one card left, he/she must call out "one card!")

Endgame
A player wins the hand by getting rid of all of his/her cards.  If a 7 or joker is played as the last card, the next player in sequence must draw the appropriate number of cards before the score is tallied.  An Ace of spades follows the same rules as if it is played during the hand.

Scoring
Once a player goes out, the other players count up the card values of their hands (after any additional cards anyone must take because of the last card played) and adds the total to their own score.  When a player reaches 500, the game is over and the player with the lowest score at that point is the winner.

Card values
Sevens, eights, kings, and the Ace of Spades are worth 20 points, jacks are worth 15, jokers are worth 25, and all other cards are worth 5.

Two-player game
In a two-player game, the king acts like an 8; when played, the other player misses a turn.

Eights group